Mutellip Iminqari (born 18 March 2004) is an ethnic Uyghur Chinese footballer currently playing as a midfielder for Chengdu Rongcheng.

Club career
Born in Xinjiang, Iminqari joined the Chengdu FA's academy, Chengdu Derui, in 2018. He represented the Hubei regional team in 2020 and 2021, before signing with Chinese Super League side Chengdu Rongcheng in April 2022.

He made his debut for Chengdu Rongcheng on 26 June 2022, against Shenzhen, and scored his first goal for the club the following month, in a 2–1 win over Tianjin Jinmen Tiger.

International career
Iminqari has represented China at under-19 and under-20 level.

Career statistics

Club
.

References

2004 births
Living people
Footballers from Xinjiang
Uyghur sportspeople
Chinese footballers
Association football midfielders
Chinese Super League players
Chengdu Rongcheng F.C. players
21st-century Chinese people